Joseph Chris Carter (born March 7, 1960) is an American former professional baseball player. He played in Major League Baseball (MLB) as an outfielder and first baseman for the Chicago Cubs, Cleveland Indians, San Diego Padres, Toronto Blue Jays, Baltimore Orioles, and San Francisco Giants. Carter hit a walk-off home run to win the 1993 World Series for the Blue Jays, their second consecutive championship. Carter is one of only two players to end a World Series with a home run, the other being Bill Mazeroski.

Career

College
Joe Carter attended Wichita State University, leaving after his junior year. He was named The Sporting News magazine's College Player of the Year in 1981. In the 1981 MLB draft, the Chicago Cubs chose him with the second overall pick.

Chicago Cubs and Cleveland Indians
Carter emerged as a prolific power hitter, hitting as many as 35 home runs in a season and regularly driving in 100 or more runs. In 1986, Carter led the major leagues with 121 runs batted in and recorded career highs of 200 base hits and 108 runs scored. He usually hit nearly as many doubles as he did homers, and would get respectable numbers of triples in many years too. He was also a very good baserunner, stealing 20-30 bases a year with a high rate of success; in 1987, Carter became a member of the single-season 30–30 club for home runs/stolen bases.

San Diego Padres
After a strong  season, Carter was traded by Cleveland to the San Diego Padres for prospects Sandy Alomar Jr., Carlos Baerga, and Chris James. Although he continued to drive in runs, he also continued to have defensive problems. The Padres subsequently dealt him to the Toronto Blue Jays along with Roberto Alomar in exchange for star players Fred McGriff and Tony Fernández.

Toronto Blue Jays

In , he helped the Jays win their first World Series championship, the first ever won by a Canadian-based team. Carter hit two home runs and recorded the final out of the Series, taking a throw to first base from reliever Mike Timlin to nab Otis Nixon of the Atlanta Braves, who bunted. This was the first time a World Series ended on a bunt.

Carter and Edwin Encarnación are the only two Blue Jays to hit two home runs in one inning, with Carter's coming against the Baltimore Orioles in 1993 and Encarnacion's against the Houston Astros in 2013.

1993 World Series

In , the Blue Jays reached the World Series again, facing the Philadelphia Phillies. In Game 6, with the Blue Jays leading three games to two, Carter came to bat with one out in the bottom of the ninth inning with the Blue Jays trailing 6–5 and Rickey Henderson and Paul Molitor on base. On a 2–2 count, Carter hit a three-run walk-off home run off Phillies pitcher Mitch Williams (against whom he had previously been 0–4 in his career) to win the World Series, only the second time a Series has ended with a home run (the other being in 1960, when Bill Mazeroski did it for the Pittsburgh Pirates against the New York Yankees), and the only time the home run has been hit by a player whose team was trailing in the bottom of the 9th inning in a potential championship clinching game. Upon hitting the home run, Carter jumped up and down many times, most notably while rounding first base, where his helmet came off. Tom Cheek, the Blue Jays' radio broadcaster, called the play: "Touch 'em all, Joe, you'll never hit a bigger home run in your life!"

1994–1997
Carter continued to play for the Blue Jays until 1997, and led the Blue Jays in home runs and RBIs in 1994 and 1995.

When he represented the Blue Jays at the 1996 All-Star Game, he received boos for his home run that won the Blue Jays the 1993 World Series, as the game took place at Veterans Stadium, then the home of the Philadelphia Phillies. During the 1997 season, he snuck an unlicensed maple wood baseball bat manufactured by Sam Bat into a game.

Baltimore Orioles and San Francisco Giants

Carter ended his career by popping out to end the game in a one-game playoff against the Chicago Cubs.

Career statistics
Carter was named to five All-Star teams. In his career he hit 396 home runs and drove in 1445 runs. He drove in 100 runs in a season ten times, including the  year, which was cut short due to the strike that occurred 115 games into the year. He was the first player to record 100 RBI for three different teams in three consecutive seasons. In 1993, while a Toronto Blue Jay, Carter set an American League record when he hit 3 home runs in a game for the fifth time in his career. (The record was tied 10 years later by another Blue Jay – Carlos Delgado.)

Carter was also involved in the final plays of four games in which the Blue Jays clinched a championship: 1) The game-winning single to drive home Roberto Alomar and clinch the 1991 American League East division championship, 2) catching the final out at first base in the 1992 World Series, 3) catching the final out on a fly ball to right field in the 1993 American League Championship Series, and 4) the walk-off home run in Game 6 of the 1993 World Series.

Post-retirement

Carter was replaced by the man whom Carter himself replaced, Steve Stone.

Carter became eligible for the Baseball Hall of Fame in 2004, however, he received 19 votes, representing 3.8% of the vote and was dropped from future ballots. Carter is currently eligible for induction via the Today's Game era committee.

Carter was inducted into the Canadian Baseball Hall of Fame in 2003.

In September 2006, Carter was awarded the Major League Baseball Hometown Heroes Award, as the former or current player who best represents the legacy of his franchise's history, as voted by fans.

In 2008, Carter appeared on an episode of Pros vs. Joes.

On August 7, 2009, Carter, along with many of his 1992 and 1993 Toronto Blue Jay World Series alumni teammates, attended a reunion/pre-game ceremony at the SkyDome. The event was organized by Carter himself and included three dozen players, coaches and athletic trainers from the Blue Jays' 1992 and 1993 World Series rosters.

On May 19, 2012, the Cleveland Indians honored Carter with a bobblehead giveaway bearing his likeness during their game against the Miami Marlins.  Carter attended and signed autographs, as well as throwing out the ceremonial first pitch.

On July 14, 2015, in a pregame ceremony before the 2015 All-Star Game, it was announced that Carter was elected by fans as a Franchise Four member of the Toronto Blue Jays, as one of the four most valuable players in franchise history.

Charity involvement
Carter co-chairs the annual "Joe Carter Classic", a celebrity golf tournament in the Toronto area founded in 2010 to benefit the Children's Aid Foundation. The tournament has raised over $2.5 million for the foundation. Previous events have featured celebrities including  Charles Barkley, Ray Bourque, and Gordie Howe.

In popular culture
In the 1999 Canadian hip hop single, "Let's Ride" by Choclair, one of the verses cites Carter's walk-off home run in the 1993 World Series, "It was the 9th inning, with two outs, I hit the home run to left field like Carter did to Philly". In actuality, there was only one out when Carter hit his home run.
In the 1999 film Big Daddy, a plot twist at the end of the film revealed by Jon Stewart's character, Kevin Gerrity, is that he fathered a child conceived in Toronto as a by-product of celebrating Carter's walk-off home run to win the 1993 World Series, and later meeting a woman that same night while inebriated.
In July 2015, Carter's walk-off home run celebration was used as the track artwork for the song "Back to Back" released by Toronto native Drake.

Awards and honors
 5× All-Star (1991, 1992, 1993, 1994, 1996)
 2× Silver Slugger Award winner (1991, 1992)
 Toronto Blue Jays Level of Excellence
In 1988, Carter was inducted into the Wichita State University Pizza Hut Shocker Hall of Fame.
In 1999, Carter was inducted into the Missouri Valley Conference Hall of Fame.
In 2003, Carter was inducted into the Canadian Baseball Hall of Fame.
In 2004, Carter was inducted into the Ontario Sports Hall of Fame.
In 2008, Carter was inducted into the Kansas Baseball Hall of Fame.

See also

 Cleveland Guardians award winners and league leaders
 List of Major League Baseball career extra base hits leaders
 List of Major League Baseball career home run leaders
 List of Major League Baseball career hits leaders
 List of Major League Baseball career runs batted in leaders
 List of Major League Baseball career runs scored leaders
 List of people from Oklahoma City
 List of Toronto Blue Jays home run leaders
 List of Wichita State University people
 Toronto Blue Jays award winners and league leaders

References

External links

The Annual Joe Carter Classic Golf Tournament

1960 births
Living people
African-American baseball players
All-American college baseball players
American expatriate baseball players in Canada
American League All-Stars
American League RBI champions
Baltimore Orioles players
Baseball players from Oklahoma
Canadian Baseball Hall of Fame inductees
Canadian television sportscasters
Chicago Cubs announcers
Chicago Cubs players
Cleveland Indians players
National College Baseball Hall of Fame inductees
Iowa Cubs players
Major League Baseball right fielders
Midland Cubs players
Sportspeople from Oklahoma City
San Diego Padres players
San Francisco Giants players
Silver Slugger Award winners
Toronto Blue Jays announcers
Toronto Blue Jays players
Wichita State Shockers baseball players
21st-century African-American people
20th-century African-American sportspeople